The UAE League Cup or the Pro League Cup is a knockout tournament for clubs in the UAE Pro-League. The first edition of the tournament was played in the 2008–2009 season.

In the 2008–09 season, UAE League Cup replaced the UAE Federation Cup and became a second tier tournament, initially under the name of Etisalat Cup in 2008–2013 and Arabian Gulf Cup in 2013–2021 for sponsorship reasons.

Finals

Performance by club

Top goalscorers
Source:

Top scorers by season

See also
UAE Super Cup
UAE President's Cup
Arabian Gulf Cup

References

External links
Official website 

 
Football cup competitions in the United Arab Emirates
Recurring sporting events established in 2008
2008 establishments in the United Arab Emirates